Graham Horrex (born 27 December 1932) was an English cricketer. He was a right-handed batsman who played for Essex. He was born in Goodmayes, Essex.

Horrex's career began in 1956, when he debuted for Essex against Kent. However, he was unable to get a first-team place following a duck and an innings defeat in two consecutive matches. He returned briefly at the beginning of the 1957 season, but holding a 1957 season average of less than five, he was out of the team at the end of the year.

Horrex was a lower-middle order batsman for the Essex team by the end of his career, having debuted as an opener.

External links
Graham Horrex at Cricket Archive  

1932 births
English cricketers
Living people
Essex cricketers